Galdino Vantuir Ramos (born Belo Horizonte, 16 November 1949), known as Vantuir, is a former Brazilian footballer who played in defence for Clube Atletico Mineiro, a team known as Rooster, and for the Brazil national football team. Vantuir played with Rooster from 1969 to 1978, with a brief stint at Flamengo in 1974. In 1978, he moved to the Guild in Porto Alegre and at the end of his career, went through America Sao Jose do Rio Preto and Rio Branco in Espírito Santo. He played for the Brazil national football team in nine games, and obtained eight wins and a draw, plus the title of the Brazil Independence Cup in 1972. He is currently a football coach in Belo Horizonte.

His first club as coach was with Clube Atlético Juventus of Divinópolis in 1984. He also worked in America Mineiro, Atlético, Al-Hilal of Saudi Arabia, Mogi Mirim, Volta Redonda, Esporte Clube Democrata and Agremiação Esportiva Canedense. In 2007, he directed the América Mineiro during the State Championship.

He won major titles in his career as a player. Atlético was Brazilian champion in 1971, and Mineiro in 1970, 1976, and 1978. He played for Grêmio when it won its first Campeonato Brasileiro in 1981 and Campeonato Gaúcho in 1979 and 1980. He coached Al-Hilal to win the Arab Club Champions Cup in 1994.

References

External links
Vantuir Galdino (ex-zagueiro do Grêmio e do Atlético-MG) Milton Neves site. 
Taça Independência no site official da CBF 
Brazil Independence Cup at RSSSF
Details of Brazil Independence Cup at RSSSF

1949 births
Living people
Association football defenders
Brazilian footballers
Brazilian football managers
Campeonato Brasileiro Série A players
Campeonato Brasileiro Série A managers
Brazil international footballers
Clube Atlético Mineiro players
CR Flamengo footballers
Grêmio Foot-Ball Porto Alegrense players
América Futebol Clube (SP) players
Rio Branco Atlético Clube players
Clube Atlético Mineiro managers
Saudi Professional League managers
Al-Wehda Club (Mecca) managers
Footballers from Belo Horizonte
Brazilian expatriate football managers
Brazilian expatriate sportspeople in Saudi Arabia
Expatriate football managers in Saudi Arabia